Trombidium fuornum is a species of mite in the genus Trombidium in the family Trombidiidae. It is found in Poland, Switzerland and France.

References
 Synopsis of the described Arachnida of the World: Trombidiidae

Trombidiidae
Animals described in 1951
Fauna of Poland